"Stop!" is a song by Jane's Addiction released on their 1990 album, Ritual de lo Habitual. It reached number one on the Billboard Modern Rock Tracks chart for two non-consecutive weeks. It was written in 1986. The song notably appears in the 2006 music video game Guitar Hero II for the PlayStation 2 and Xbox 360 and DLC for the 2015 video game Rock Band 4.

Track listing

Chart positions

See also 
Number one modern rock hits of 1990

References

Jane's Addiction songs
1990 singles
Songs written by Perry Farrell
Songs written by Dave Navarro
1986 songs
Warner Records singles